The former Province of Turin was a province in the Piedmont region of Italy. Its capital was the city of Turin. The province existed until 31 December 2014, when it was replaced by the Metropolitan City of Turin.

Geography
There were 316 comuni (municipalities) in the province – the most of any province in Italy. The second highest comuni are in the Province of Cuneo which has 250. Torino, the former capital of the province, and capital of the present day Metropolitan City of Turin, was the first national capital of unified Italy in 1861.

Economy
The most important export items from the Turin province are automobiles, machinery, and metal products. The province has commercial relations with Germany, France, Poland, Spain, United Kingdom, Romania and Czech Republic. A large quantity of import and export is carried with these nations. 

Service is the most important economic sector accounting to 66% of the gross domestic product. The other two important sectors are industry (32%) and agriculture (2%). In order to promote entrepreneurship, the provincial body has started "Start Your Own Business", an advice service to help aspiring entrepreneurs who have new business ideas.

See also 

 Piedmontese language
 Franco-Provençal language
 Sacro Monte di Belmonte
 House of Savoy
 Residences of the Royal House of Savoy
 Gran Paradiso National Park — Parco Nazionale del Gran Paradiso.

References

External links
Official former website
Turin Quality of Life and Info Sheet

 
.
Turin